Bergpartei, die ÜberPartei, stylized as bergpartei, die überpartei and shortened as B*, is an anarchist, dadaist party in Germany.

It is known for the holding of a vegetable battle between two rival districts of Berlin and the video activist film festival nodogma.

Program
B* has no domination claim, but refuses to be a joke party. Its additional designation is: radical feminist arm, utopian solidarity branch, post-identity anti-national, anti-materialist action.

In 2005, the Bergpartei was the first German party to enshrine the unconditional basic income, called existence money back then in its program.

Posters and slogans
The party is famous for its handmade posters and billboards.

History
It was founded on 1 April 2011 by fusing two grassroot squatter parties.

The party's founding chairholder was Jan Theiler.

Electoral Results
In the Berlin elections 2011, the party gained 0.9 % in the district Friedrichshain-Kreuzberg (including 3.2% in the former squats area "Wahlkreis 5"). In the national elections 2013, the party gained 0.4% in the same district. Berlin 2016: 3,1 % in area Wahlkreis 5 and 0,5 % in the whole district of Friedrichshain-Kreuzberg.
2021 elections were held in Berlin and whole Germany same time. Bergpartei decided to support the referendum to expropriate landlords but still doubled their votes.

See also
Dadaism
Green anarchism
List of political parties in Germany

Webpages 
www.bergpartei.de official page of Bergpartei

Notes

Anarchist organisations in Germany
Anarchist political parties
Autonomism
Dada
Green political parties in Germany
Political parties established in 2011
Universal basic income in Germany
Political parties supporting universal basic income